This is a list of various kinds of hat, contemporary or traditional. Headgear has been common throughout the history of humanity, present on some of the very earliest preserved human bodies and art.


See also
List of headgear

References

External links

Clothing-related lists